Ladislav Krejčí may refer to:

Ladislav Krejčí (footballer, born 1992), Czech footballer
Ladislav Krejčí (footballer, born 1999), Czech footballer